David A. Ulliott (also known as Devilfish)(1 April 1954 – 6 April 2015), was an English professional gambler and poker player. Formerly, Ulliott was a minor figure in the Hull underworld, but went on to become a World Series of Poker bracelet-winner, and a mainstay of televised poker. At the poker table, he was known for wearing orange-tinted prescription sunglasses, a sharp suit (or leather jacket) and gold knuckleduster rings reading "Devil" and "Fish", which he made himself.  In 2017 he was elected to the Poker Hall of Fame.

Early years
Ulliott was born in 1954. He grew up in a small council house in a working-class area. Ulliott was unmotivated throughout his education and left school at the age of 15. After visiting the bookies with his father and winning his first bet at 50:1, he picked winners at horse racing with his colleagues during hot lunch breaks. He was eventually fired from the job for taking an afternoon off to go to the races.

At the age of 19, Ulliott was involved in a fight on the way home from the Golden Nugget Pool Hall in Kingston upon Hull. Ulliott was set upon by five men and their wives (one of whom slashed his face with a steel comb), after protecting his younger brother. He fought back and eventually returned home. Ulliott later claimed that he was proud of the experience and the incident made him realise that he could not be beaten in a fight "inside".

Criminal activities
Ulliott became involved in a safe-cracking team soon afterwards, after being advised by the rest of the team that everyone was involved in the operation, including the shops, which carried out insurance fraud, and the police, who turned a blind eye. Together, they targeted tobacconists, off-licence, and garages. On one occasion, when Ulliott lost over £5,000 at the bookies, he robbed that safe too, and took it home in a pram. One of the team was eventually caught, and informed the police that Ulliott was involved. He went on the run for a week, but was eventually caught.

Ulliott was confined to a small cell in Kingston upon Hull Police Station for three weeks, and was later sent to Leeds Prison, where he was kept in isolation for 23 hours a day for the first two months of his nine-month sentence, which included his 21st birthday. Not long after his release, he was arrested again for an armed robbery at an off-license, but was released three days later without charge. Upon his release, he got a job at a timber yard. Later, he again became involved in the safe-cracking team, while also working as a bouncer and gambling.

Ulliott was arrested again aged 28 for a fight outside a nightclub, and served 18 months in Leeds and Durham Prisons. Again he spent much time in an isolation block for 23 hours a day. During this time, he met a criminal named John, with whom he planned to carry out a bank robbery upon his release. However, on the day it was planned to happen, John was arrested by the regional crime squad, and Ulliott was advised by John's wife to "go straight". Not long after Ulliott met his second wife, he decided to abstain from criminal activities.

Poker career
Ulliott began playing poker with his parents as a young child and later learned three card brag at the age of 16, after being introduced to Hull's Fifty-One Club casino. By the time of his second marriage, Ulliott was organising poker games in the back of his shop and dominating the home games of others to the extent that people stopped telling him where they were being held. At the end of 1990, he met Gary Whitaker, a cafe manager from Wakefield, at Napoleon's Casino, Leeds. They travelled together to poker games six nights a week, and Whitaker placed bets for Ulliott after he was banned from all of William Hill's betting shops for successfully gambling £4,000 up to £70,000. Whitaker went on to become Ulliott's regular driver as he took part in a regular game with Dave Colclough, John Shipley and Lucy Rokach, and held a 10% stake in his action.

When they first travelled to London (where the regular game at the time was lowball), Ulliott was forced to change his style of play as he found the players harder to bluff; he credits the experience for improving his game. On one occasion in London, Ulliott lost a £60,000 pot to Donnacha O'Dea when the latter hit a two-outer against him, but made all the money back within 24 hours. On another occasion, Ulliott played in five cities in a day, winning in each to earn £35,000.

When playing in private games, Ulliott often took a gun to ensure he would be able to leave a poker game with the winnings. He fired it in the air one night to scare off some opponents who were planning to rob him of the money he had won from them.

Devilfish
Ulliott first won money in a noted poker tournament in 1993. Over the following years, Ulliott worked on his tournament game to the extent that, during 1996, he won £100,000 in a two-week period at The Vic. His success at that time led to him and Whitaker going to Las Vegas, Nevada for the first time.

Ulliott took £10,000 with him on the trip, and was around even, until he entered the $500 pot limit Omaha event of the 1997 Four Queens Poker Classic. When the event reached the heads-up stage, numerous Vietnamese-American followers of Men Nguyen supported the latter by cheering "Go on the Master" at him. In response, Whitaker cheered Ulliott on by cheering "Go on the Devilfish." The nickname was thought up by Stephen Au-Yeung early 1997, who ran a poker game that Ulliott had frequented in Birmingham UK, who later sold him the website DevilFishPoker.com in 2005; a devilfish (or fugu) is a poisonous fish that can kill when ingested, if not properly prepared. Ulliott reduced Nguyen's stack to one chip, and the tournament director insisted upon still taking a one-hour scheduled break, over Nguyen's protests. Ulliott turned to Nguyen and said, "We’re taking the break, and in all fairness to you, I think you should go upstairs and think about your tactics." Ulliott went on to win, and the headlines the next day read, Devilfish devours the Master. Since the event, Ulliott claimed that the event was only of significance for defining his nickname.

Prior to earning the nickname, Ulliott had been referred to as Dave the Clock because he used a grandfather clock as a buy-in to a local game where he knew a furniture dealer was playing.

1997 World Series of Poker
Ulliott arrived at the 1997 World Series of Poker (WSOP) with $200,000, but lost it all on cash games and tournament buy-ins. He borrowed over $70,000 more, but lost this too, burning some bridges in the process. He scraped together a buy-in for the $2,000 pot limit Texas hold 'em event, where he reached heads-up against fellow Englishman Chris Truby. In the final hand, Ulliott got all of his money in the pot with an open-ended straight draw and flush draw against Truby's top set. Ulliott won with a straight on the river to claim $180,310 and his only WSOP bracelet. Whitaker jumped over the barricade to join in the celebrations. The press release the next day claimed he was lucky to draw out on Truby, but mathematically, Ulliott was a 54.5% favourite to win when the money went into the pot. After winning his bracelet, he had the nickname "Devilfish" engraved on it.

Following the tournament he went through a highly successful period playing in cash games, winning between $10,000 and 20,000 each day for a two-week stretch. During one session, on the advice of his friend Mansour Matloubi, he played Lyle Berman heads-up pot limit Omaha and beat him out of $168,000. By the end of the trip, Ulliott had $742,000 in cash, that he carried around with Whitaker in bags from duty-free. When returning to their casino in Leeds, Ulliott and Whitaker were met with great applause from their regular opponents.

Late Night Poker
In 1999, Ulliott was one of 40 players to appear in the first series of the Late Night Poker television series, the first poker show to use hole cam technology. He won his qualifying heat against a field that included Charalambos "Bambos" Xanthos and future Hendon Mobster Ross Boatman to advance to the Grand Final. Ulliott dominated the final from the first hand (where his flush beat Surinder Sunar's straight). During the event, he made four of a kind against Joe Beevers, eliminated Liam Flood and slow-played three aces against Dave Welch, prompting commentator Nic Szeremeta to say, "I've never seen a hand played so well." Ulliott went on to win the heads-up confrontation against Peter Evans, and the £40,000 first prize.

Ulliott's win was watched by over 1,500,000 people (a huge figure for the channel and timeslot of the broadcast) and his character at the table was part of the reason for the renewal of the series, which went on to run for five more series, with Ulliott appearing in them all. Ulliott also made the final table in the second series.

World Poker Tour
In January 2003, Ulliott won his biggest tournament cash prize in the World Poker Tour (WPT) first season Jack Binion World Poker Open. Ulliott outlasted a field of 160 players, entering the final table with a 2:1 chip lead over his nearest rival, and taking first place and $589,175 after eliminating Phil Ivey. Ulliott eliminated four of his five opponents at the final table, in a performance that commentator Mike Sexton has referred to as "still the most dominating performance in WPT history." In the second season, Ulliott was also invited to the WPT Bad Boys of Poker Invitational, and finished on the television bubble of the Aruba Poker Classic.

In December 2007, Ulliott came in 3rd place in the sixth season of the WPT Doyle Brunson Classic Championship Event earning $674,500.

Other events
Ulliott came close to winning a second WSOP bracelet on numerous occasions, finishing second in events at the 1998 WSOP and 2000 WSOP, and second at two more events at the 2001 WSOP. In two of these events, he was eliminated whilst holding aces.

Ulliott represented his country in the Poker Nations Cup, the PartyPoker.com Football & Poker Legends Cup and the Intercontinental Poker Championship as well as the inaugural British Poker Open, which had a strong American field in contention.

At the PartyPoker Premier League, he embarked on a rivalry with Phil Hellmuth, including one six-man game where Ulliott called Hellmuth's all-in bluff with A♠-8♠ against Hellmuth's 7♥-5♥, making him a better than 60% favourite. Hellmuth flopped the nut straight. Later in the same game, Hellmuth's pocket nines beat Ulliott's aces.

Ulliott's total lifetime tournament winnings exceeded $6,200,000, making him the highest-earning English poker player after Sam Trickett according to available records. His 33 cashes at the WSOP account for $1,708,075 of those winnings.

Personal life
Ulliott was married three times. He had two children, Paul and Kerry, with his first wife Susan; four sons with Amanda (Mandy) Ashby, named Stephen, Christopher, Michael and Matthew; one son, David, with his common-law wife Diana and a daughter, Lucy, with Anpaktita, his third wife. He lived in Kingston upon Hull, not far from where he grew up.

Autobiography 
In spring 2010, Penguin Books announced the publication of Ulliott's autobiography, DEVILFISH: The Life & Times of a Poker Legend, in September 2010. It was launched at Poker in the Park – Europe's largest free poker festival, held in London's Leicester Square – with a book signing session and talk by Ulliott. The book was very favourably reviewed by journalist and poker player Victoria Coren in The Observer saying: "I was nervous to review it, in case it was bad. Dave Ulliot is a friend of mine. And he has a gun. But I needn't have worried. The book is, like the man, fast, funny, scary, smart, cocky, colourful, and I adore them both." She recounted her first meeting with Ulliot:
In the winter of 1999, on the sixth floor of a Cardiff hotel, I walked into a lift to find it already occupied by an elderly couple and a tall, sinister-looking fellow in a black leather trench coat and red sunglasses. "The Devilfish!" I breathed. "Can I hold your bracelet?" Without a word, the shady gentleman slipped a heavy gold bracelet off his wrist and jingled it into my hand. The elderly couple must have thought we were both insane.

Death
Ulliott was diagnosed with colon cancer in February 2015, and died of the disease on 6 April 2015 at the age of 61.

Legacy & reputation
Despite the dominance of Texas hold'em throughout televised poker, Ulliott had a reputation as a very strong pot limit Omaha player, with over 40 finishes in the money in tournaments of that type. Once, in an Omaha cash game at The Vic in 1997, he successfully read that Jon Shoreman had a straight flush and laid down a four of a kind. Ulliott was also considered the best five-card stud player in Northern England. However, Ulliott indicated that his real preference was for four card Omaha.

In the UK, Ulliott was particularly well-known, even being mentioned in EastEnders. He also appeared on the front cover of the inaugural edition of PokerPlayer magazine, and was voted No. 9 on their Top 10 Poker Legends List.

Ulliott was associated with the online poker site Devilfish Poker. After being eliminated in third place for $120,000 in the Full Tilt Poker invitational event at the 2005 Monte Carlo Millions, Ulliott stood up, flashing a "www.devilfishpoker.com" sign that was strapped to his back inside his jacket. The event was being broadcast live on Fox Sports Net (FSN), which has a policy against advertising .com websites, and Ulliott was banned from appearing in any forthcoming FSN productions. Ulliott later responded that he only paid the entry money so he could advertise his site; it was originally agreed that he would be able to promote the site, so he decided to advertise his site through the publicity stunt regardless. Despite supporting online poker sites, Ulliott indicated that many online players do not know what they are doing when playing, which makes them harder to play against.

Ulliott became the subject of some controversy when he claimed that female poker players would never be as good as male players. He cited Lucy Rokach as a rare example of a strong female player, but still maintained that female players would never be aggressive enough to compete with their male counterparts.

Ulliott claimed that his gambling wins led to him being banned by all the British bookmakers. He also claimed that Joe Beevers placed bets on his behalf for a period of time, during which time he managed to back all six winners at Ascot one year, including one at 14/1 and one at 20/1.

In his later years, Ulliott attempted to change his image, no longer wearing slicked-back hair or sunglasses at the poker table. This was a result of attending a party in Las Vegas, where he felt everyone looked the same as him.

Notes

1954 births
2015 deaths
English poker players
World Poker Tour winners
World Series of Poker bracelet winners
People from Kingston upon Hull
Deaths from colorectal cancer
Deaths from cancer in England
Poker Hall of Fame inductees